The Mount Baigu, also known as Mount Xalut, is a mountain in Heping District, Taichung, Taiwan. The mountain has an elevation of 3,341 m.

See also
List of mountains in Taiwan

References

Landforms of Taichung
Baigu